Cornelius "Neil" Franklin (24 January 1922 – 9 February 1996) was an English footballer who played for Crewe Alexandra, Hull City, Stockport County and Stoke City as well as the England national team.

Career

Stoke City
Franklin was born in Shelton, Stoke-on-Trent and emerged from Stoke City's nursery club Stoke Old Boys. At 15 he won schoolboy international honours as a right half and signed professional forms with Stoke in January 1939. The outbreak of World War II soon gave opportunities to Stoke's apprentices and Franklin made his senior debut at the end of 1939–40, before volunteering with the Royal Air Force in February 1941. He converted to centre back due to the absence of Billy Mould and also took his place of captain. Franklin thrived in his new-found position and his positioning and tackling ability was described by the press as 'perfection'. Franklin helped remove the stereotype of centre backs as being just stoppers as he was very comfortable on the ball and earned his first England cap in February 1945. His goalkeeper Dennis Herod was often left frustrated by Franklin's genius. "He was a great player, but so unpredictable. If he was under pressure he would shout to me Dennis, come on and I would come out expecting him to give me the ball. Nine times out of ten he would do a u-turn and trot off up the field. It was like playing in a minefield. He didn't believe he could have a bad game and was the only one who didn't suffer with nerves."

Stoke narrowly missed out on their first league title in 1946–47 losing their must win match against Sheffield United 2–1. Stoke manager Bob McGrory was becoming frustrated with his side's best players, and after selling Stanley Matthews to Blackpool and his gripe soon turned to Franklin. McGrory wanted him to play the ball earlier rather than keep possession and be more physical in his defensive work which led him to handing the captaincy back to Mould. McGrory's campaign against him eventually led Franklin to announcing his intentions to leave Stoke in the summer of 1949. A world record bid of £30,000 from Hull City was mooted but the Stoke directors rejected Franklin's request and he re-signed four games into the 1949–50 season. However, he won a large bet of £250 which gave him the confidence to make an astonishing announcement to the football world. He declined a place in the England squad for the 1950 FIFA World Cup in Brazil, saying that his wife was due to give birth in the summer and he was to spend time playing in Colombia for Independiente Santa Fe.

Move to Colombia
Santa Fe's president, Luis Robledo, had studied at Cambridge and believed that high quality football could put an end to the country's civil war. Robledo also tempted Franklin's Stoke teammate George Mountford to join him in Bogotá. The pair were paid £60 per week plus a huge £2,000 signing-on fee, more than four times the maximum wage in England. England manager Walter Winterbottom tried to persuade him not to go but he ignored his request and left for Santa Fe on 8 May 1950. In Colombia they joined up with Manchester United's Charlie Mitten. Colombia had been expelled by FIFA for poaching players from around the world and the 'rebel' players were also banned by FIFA. On arriving in Colombia Franklin was full of bravado, saying that "We'll live finer than any footballers in the world." Despite a good start with Santa Fe, problems soon arose. A 6.30 pm curfew limited their ability to socialise, and his wife was struggling with the culture and unrest, so Franklin returned to England by August.

Return to England
On his return to England Franklin faced the wrath of the Football Association and Stoke who suspended him indefinitely and then sold him to Hull City in February 1951 for £22,500. Damaged knee ligaments restricted Franklin's movement and he failed to reach his former high standards. In February 1956 he joined Crewe Alexandra and then ended his career with Stockport County and finally non-league Macclesfield Town.

Managerial career
In 1958 Franklin emigrated to New Zealand to become player-manager at Wellington Town. [This is incorrect, Franklin in fact joined former England player, Johnny Hancocks, at Wellington Town, in Shropshire, renamed in 1969 as Telford Utd  after the new town Development]
He returned to Europe in 1963 and managed APOEL in Cyprus where his time was cut short again due to civil war. He joined Colchester United in 1964 and got the club promoted in 1965–66, however relegation followed in 1967–68 and he was sacked.

Recognition

Billy Wright, when selecting his Dream Team for the 50th Anniversary of the Footballer of the Year award, had no hesitation in selecting Neil Franklin:
Neil was a superb stylist with an instinctive positional sense. His international career ended when he was suspended for becoming a mercenary in the outlawed Bogotá league. If Neil had been satisfied with the maximum £20 he was earning at Stoke City, he would have played for England for at least another four years, and I often wonder what difference that would have made to my career.

Stanley Matthews also rated Franklin:
Neil won everything in the air, tackled with superb timing and when the ball was at his feet possessed the nous to pass it with all the guile and intelligence of the most cerebral of inside-forwards. An erect physique belied tremendous mobility and breathtaking speed over four or five yards.

Tom Finney also selected Neil Franklin for his Dream Team:
(Neil Franklin was) the best centre-half I ever played with or against. Just before the 1950 World Cup, he went off to play in Colombia, thinking he was going to make a bit of money, but it didn't work out. When he came back, the FA were furious and clubs wouldn't touch him. He was still good enough to play for England, though. It was very sad.

Legacy

In August 2019, the story of Neil Franklin's life and career was published in a book entitled England's Greatest Defender: The Untold Story of Neil Franklin by author Alfie Potts Harmer; the creator of the YouTube channel HITC Sevens and a fan of Hull City, one of Franklin's former clubs.

Career statistics

Club
Source:

International
Source:

References

External links
 
 Neil Franklin profile on Stoke City hall of fame
 profile at Spartacus Educational
 Neil Franklin: A Career Destroyed in Six Matches

1922 births
1996 deaths
People from Shelton, Staffordshire
Footballers from Stoke-on-Trent
English footballers
England international footballers
England wartime international footballers
Crewe Alexandra F.C. players
Hull City A.F.C. players
Macclesfield Town F.C. players
Stockport County F.C. players
Stoke City F.C. players
Independiente Santa Fe footballers
English expatriate footballers
Expatriate footballers in Colombia
English expatriate sportspeople in Colombia
English football managers
Colchester United F.C. managers
Expatriate football managers in Cyprus
English expatriate sportspeople in Cyprus
APOEL FC managers
English Football League players
English Football League representative players
Categoría Primera A players
Association football defenders
Royal Air Force personnel of World War II